Norfolk is a live album by Iron & Wine released on April 18, 2009, Record Store Day. However it was recorded on June 20, 2005. It received an extremely limited release and is now only available on Iron & Wine's official website.

Description
The session was recorded at The Norva in Norfolk, VA  as a date on Iron & Wine's 2005 Woman King Tour. It features a full band as well as Samuel Beam's sister, Sarah Beam, providing backing vocals. The album features 5 of the 6 songs on the Woman King EP as well as a few songs from the debut album The Creek Drank the Cradle. Many of the songs are also from his second album, 2004's Our Endless Numbered Days. The then-unreleased b-side "Communion Cups and Someone's Coat" also appears as well as a live rendition of the fan favorite "The Trapeze Swinger". The album was released in support of genuine, independently owned record stores.

Track listing

References

Iron & Wine albums
2009 live albums
Record Store Day releases